Elections to Liverpool Town Council were held on Wednesday 1 November 1848, with the exception of Castle Street and Scotland wards where the elections were held on 2 November because the Aldermen for these wards were not able to act as returning officers. One third of the council seats were up for election, the term of office of each councillor being three years.

Eight of the sixteen wards were uncontested.

This was the first year that the local press referred to "Liberals" rather than "Reformers"

The main issue at this election was whether the Corporation estate and the docks should be subject to Rates (tax).

After the election, the composition of the council was:

Election result

Because half of the wards were uncontested, these statistics should be taken in that context.

Ward results

* - Retiring Councillor seeking re-election

Abercromby

Polling Place : The Phœnix Inn, on the east side of Mount-pleasant.

Castle Street

Polling Place : The Saracen's Head in Dale-street.

Everton

Polling Place : The Public-house on the north side of Great Homer-street, Occupied by Mr. Charles Unwin.

Francis Shand was opposed to the rating of the Corporation and Dock Estates, Edward Langsdale was of the opposite view.

Exchange

Polling Place : The north end of the Sessions' house, in Chapel-street.

Thomas Littledale jun. was a pro-rater.

Great George

Polling Place : The Shop, No. 64 at the north side of Nelson-street, occupied by Mr. Richard Hesketh.

Lime Street

Polling Place : The Public-house of Mr. William Prescott, at the corner of St. Vincent-street, London-road.

James Johnson was a pro-rater.

North Toxteth

Polling Place : The Public-house, sign of "The Royal Oak", corner of Warwick-street, Park-road.

William Fisher was a pro-rater.

Pitt Street

Polling Place : The Committee-room of the South Corporation School, in Park-lane.

Thomas Robinson was a pro-rater.

Rodney Street

Polling Place : The Shop, near the entrance to the New Arcade, on the west side of Renshaw-street, occupied by Mr. Robert Brassey.

George Booker was a pro-rater.

St. Anne Street

Polling Place : The House of Mr. Thomas Hindle, on the west side of Christian-street

Thomas Pool was a pro-rater.

St. Paul's

Polling Place : The House of Mr. Mather, at the northwest corner of St. Paul's-square.

Both candidates were pro-raters.

St. Peter's

Polling Place : The Public-house, sign of "The Horse and Jockey" in Seel-street'

John Ferguson, a determined pro-rater and chairman of the National Federation.

Scotland

Polling Place : The House No. 64, on the north side of Burlington-street, near Limekiln-lane, occupied by Mr. Joseph Jones.

James Thomson advocated the rating of the Corporate and Dock estates.

South Toxteth

Polling Place : The Shop, on the west side of Park-road, occupied by Mrs. Eliza Gould, near the church of St. John the Baptist.

Edward Cannon Hindley was a pro-rater.

Vauxhall

Polling Place : The House occupied by Mr. George Gurden, on the west side of Vauxhall-road nearly opposite the end of Blackstock-street.

William Rathbone was an advocate of the Rivington Pike water scheme and opposed to the rating 
of the Corporate and Dock estates. Mr. Hodson took the contrary views.

West Derby

Polling Place : The House, on the south side of Edge-hill, opposite the Church, in the occupation of Mrs. Mary Fleetwood.

Richard Mitchell Beckwith was a pro-rater.

See also
Liverpool Town Council elections 1835 - 1879
Liverpool City Council elections 1880–present
Mayors and Lord Mayors of Liverpool 1207 to present
History of local government in England

References

1848
1848 English local elections
November 1848 events
1840s in Liverpool